This is a list of episodes of the ninth season of The Ellen DeGeneres Show, which aired from September 2011 to June 2012.

Episodes

References

External links
 

9
2011 American television seasons
2012 American television seasons